Robinson House is a historic home located at Severna Park in Anne Arundel County, Maryland, United States.  It was built about 1740 and is a -story stone dwelling with a gambrel roof, 40 feet wide by 24 feet deep.  It is built of red sandstone, locally known as ironstone.

It was listed on the National Register of Historic Places in 2009.

References

External links
, at Maryland Historical Trust

Houses on the National Register of Historic Places in Maryland
Houses in Anne Arundel County, Maryland
Gothic Revival architecture in Maryland
Houses completed in 1740
National Register of Historic Places in Anne Arundel County, Maryland
1740 establishments in Maryland
Severna Park, Maryland